Zoran Vujic (born 8 March 1972) is a Yugoslavian-born Austrian football striker. He played in the Austrian Football Bundesliga for Austria Lustenau.

References

1972 births
Living people
Serbian emigrants to Austria
Austrian footballers
SC Rheindorf Altach players
SC Austria Lustenau players
FC Dornbirn 1913 players
FC Braunau players
Association football forwards
Austrian Football Bundesliga players